Flimbo's Quest is a 2D platform game published by British publishing house System 3 (later renamed to Studio 3 Interactive) for the Commodore 64, Amiga, Atari ST and Amstrad CPC. A ZX Spectrum version was produced but never released. The game itself was developed by Laurens van der Donk in the Netherlands who was involved in the Demoscene being in both Boys Without Brains (BWB) and Hotline.

The music was put together by developers Maniacs of Noise. The original C64 music is composed by Johannes Bjerregaard with an exception of a loader music which was composed by Reyn Ouwehand (he later released a remix of this song). Charles Deenen arranged Amiga version's music which follows Bjerregaard's original.

Overview
The mad scientist Fransz Dandruff has created a machine that draws the life energy from its victim for him, thus extending his life indefinitely. Dandruff kidnaps Pearly, beauty queen of Dewdropland, to provide this energy. Her boyfriend Flimbo sets out to save her.

The player controls Flimbo through seven distinct levels, collecting scrolls for the wizard Dazz Bazian, to allow him to create a spell that will send Flimbo to the next level. The levels are free-roaming, and some exploration is necessary to find the scrolls from enemies dotted around the lair, as well as other secrets such as banks and various power-ups: a super weapon, which extends the range and power of Flimbo's shooting enabling longshots to be fired across the screen, invulnerability which lasts for 30 seconds—this does not protect from water or holes—and in level 6, hourglasses which add 2 minutes to the time limit. All of these can be bought in Dazz's shops, along with individual letters or complete words of the code. Hearts can also be obtained in five colours to give the player an extra life, again these can be taken from enemies in the game.

Flimbo's Quest takes place over seven levels: a normal rural landscape, a fishing village, a mountain landscape, a weird alien world, a forest, a graveyard and Fransz Dandruff's laboratory. There are two different background musics, which alternate between the levels.

Although there are essentially only a few different types of enemy in each level, there is a further and more frustrating distinction to be made by the player, in terms of location on the level. In level 5 for example, it may be required to kill an antelope, but it isn't possible to tell from the mugshot alone where in the level it is (an enemy carrying a scroll will flash on the 8-bit versions, or have an arrow on top of it on the Amiga and Atari ST versions). It has also been discovered that there is a maximum amount of money to get in any level, assuming that the player kills enough enemies on each part of the screen, though with the stringent time limit this is inadvisable.

Each level provides two or three secret power-ups, which can be activated by simultaneously firing and ducking in the right places; generally in less frequented positions, which can be used to quickly finish the level. Among the power-ups available are superscrolls, item upgrade (free heart/heart to scroll/scroll to superscroll), 2 minutes extra time, and a "smart bomb" which will destroy all enemies on and just outside the boundaries of the screen.

At the end of level seven, the letters that Flimbo has collected are revealed to be assembly language instructions, and are programmed into Dandruff's computer to free Pearly. When the game is completed, it restarts from the beginning with the time count, money, lives, hearts (if any) and score that the player had at the end of the game.

Reaction
The video gaming press gave Flimbo's Quest a lukewarm reception as standard and unoriginal platform fare. However, the C64 version achieved a high level of distribution thanks to the game being distributed on a cartridge with four games on it, distributed in the early 1990s with the Commodore 64. The cartridge was also distributed with the ill-fated Commodore 64 Games System console (also known as the C64GS).

Notes
Because of the "cartoony" font the title "Flimbo's Quest" was written on the game disk, and the hard-to-read brown-on-blue colours, it was often misread as "Fumbo's Quest" with the L and I merging into a U. Some software retailers even marketed the game with this name.

External links

Zzap 64 review of flimbo's quest

1990 video games
Commodore 64 games
Amiga games
Amstrad CPC games
Atari ST games
Cancelled ZX Spectrum games
Video games developed in the United Kingdom
Video games developed in the Netherlands